Canada Falls is a waterfall in Delaware County, New York. It is located west of Margaretville along NY–28, on an unnamed creek that flows through Canada Hollow.

References

Waterfalls of New York (state)
Landforms of Delaware County, New York
Tourist attractions in Delaware County, New York